Mata'afa Lealaisalanoa Muliufi  (died 29 February 1936) was a Western Samoan high chief and politician. He held the Tama-a-Aiga title of Mata'afa from 1915 until his death.

Biography
Muliufi was born into the Mata'afa family. He attended a Catholic Seminary on Wallis with the intention of becoming a priest, but later abandoned the idea. He added Salanoa to his name when he became one of the ranking chiefs of Falefa, Lealaisalanoa. In 1915 he succeeded to the title of Mata'afa after the death of Mata'afa Tupuola Iose.

After his uncle Tuimaleali'ifano Fa'aoloi'i Si'ua'ana was removed from the post of Fautua (advisor to the Governor) in 1927 due to him sympathising with the Mau movement, Muliufi was selected as his replacement. Two years later he was appointed to the Legislative Council as one of the two nominated Samoans.

He was appointed an honorary Officer of the Order of the British Empire in the 1935 King's Birthday and Silver Jubilee Honours, and was invested in February 1936, but died a few weeks later after a long illness. He was buried at Mulinu'u in the burial ground housing the royal tombs of the Tama-a-Aiga, Samoa's highest chiefs.

References

Samoan chiefs
Members of the Legislative Council of Samoa
Honorary Officers of the Order of the British Empire
1936 deaths